"Bull in the Heather" is a song by American alternative rock band Sonic Youth from their eighth studio album, Experimental Jet Set, Trash and No Star (1994). It was released to radio as the lead single from the album on April 19, 1994, by Geffen Records. The song was written collectively by Sonic Youth, and production was done by Butch Vig. According to band member Kim Gordon, the song is about "using passiveness as a form of rebellion."

Background
The single featured an outtake, "Razor Blade", and an alternate version of "Doctor's Orders" as B-sides.

Singer and bassist Kim Gordon explained that the song is about "using passiveness as a form of rebellion—like, I'm not going to participate in your male-dominated culture, so I'm just going to be passive". The song's title is a reference to the race horse Bull inthe Heather, who won the Florida Derby in 1993.

Critical reception
Barbara O'Dair of Rolling Stone referred to the song as "enigmatic," highlighting Gordon's "breathy, talk-singing." Also from Rolling Stone, Matthew Perpetua praised the song's "graceful combinations of pop songwriting and off-kilter experimental noise," making note of the unorthodox guitar techniques employed throughout it.

Chart performance
In the United States, "Bull in the Heather" debuted at number 29 on the Billboard Alternative Airplay chart for the issue dated May 28, 1994. The song reached a peak of number 13 for the issue dated June 18, 1994, spending a total of eight weeks on the chart. The song became Sonic Youth's highest charting song in the United Kingdom, reaching a peak of number 24 on the UK Singles Chart for the issue dated May 7, 1994. The song spent a total of five weeks on the chart. In Australia, the song reached a peak position of number 90 on the ARIA Charts.

Music video
The music video was directed by Tamra Davis and produced by Kris Krengle. Filmed in Los Angeles, the video features Bikini Kill singer Kathleen Hanna dancing and occasionally interacting with the band members, particularly guitarist Thurston Moore; she accidentally gave Moore a bloody lip during filming. Also featured are a young couple hanging out in a semi-wooded field and stock footage of horses racing. 

The scenes of Moore and Lee Ranaldo jumping around on a bed were inspired by a photo of Moore when he was younger. At the time of the video, bassist Kim Gordon was five months pregnant.

The music video was featured in an episode of Beavis and Butt-Head.

Live performances
Sonic Youth performed the song during their set at Battery Park’s River to River Festival on July 4, 2008. A recording of this performance was released as a promotional single on June 7, 2019 and was subsequently included on the live album Battery Park, NYC July 4th 2008.

Legacy
In 2007, NME placed "Bull in the Heather" at No. 48 in its list of the 50 "Greatest Indie Anthems Ever". Spin placed the song at No. 37 in its list of "The 100 Best Alternative Rock Songs of 1994".

"Bull in the Heather" directly influenced The Strokes' 2003 single "12:51", and lead singer Julian Casablancas would admit that the phrasing was "totally ripping it off".

Track listings and formats
 10" vinyl and CD single
 "Bull in the Heather" (LP version) – 3:04
 "Razor Blade"  – 1:06
 "Doctor's Orders" (T.-Vox version) – 4:20
 7" vinyl and cassette single
 "Bull in the Heather" (LP version) – 3:04
 "Razor Blade"  – 1:06

Credits and personnel
Credits and personnel are adapted from the Experimental Jet Set, Trash and No Star album liner notes.

Sonic Youth
 Thurston Moore – guitar
 Kim Gordon – vocals, bass
 Lee Ranaldo – guitar
 Steve Shelley – drums, percussion

Technical
 Butch Vig – recording, mixing, production
 John Siket – engineering
 Howie Weinberg – mastering
 Bil Emmons – technician
 Devin Emke – technician
 Ed Raso – technician
 Fred Kevorkian – technician
 Ollie Cotton – technician
 Walter Sear – technician

Charts

Release history

References

1994 singles
Sonic Youth songs
Song recordings produced by Butch Vig
Music videos directed by Tamra Davis
1994 songs